Haeggochiton is an extinct  of polyplacophoran mollusc known from a single occurrence in the Cretaceous of Europe.

References 

Prehistoric chiton genera
Monotypic mollusc genera
Cretaceous molluscs
Cretaceous Europe